Airmyn is a village and civil parish in the East Riding of Yorkshire, England. It lies to the west of the M62 motorway and the A614 road. According to the 2011 UK census, Airmyn parish had a population of 768, a fall from the 2001 UK census figure of 795.

The parish was part of the Goole Rural District in the West Riding of Yorkshire from 1894 to 1974, then in Boothferry district of Humberside until 1996.

In the Middle Ages, Airmyn was a small port, and up to the 18th century its dead were taken by boat upstream to be buried at Snaith, as it was quicker to go by river than by horse and cart.

Buildings

The village has its own primary school, Airmyn Park Primary School, which holds just over 100 pupils. The present building was opened in 1991, and has four classrooms, together with a hall, communal areas and offices. It was designed for 105 children. Before moving to the new building, the school was located on High Street, in a building which was erected in 1834 by George Percy, the Earl of Beverley. It was intended to be a Sunday School, but was being used as a day-school by 1840, and was able to accommodate 120 pupils. Near the old school is a clock tower, designed by Henry Francis Lockwood of Bradford and built in 1865, which was paid for by the village population, to honour the memory of the second Earl, who funded the building of the school.

There is a memorial hall located next to the village field, and "Woodland Park", named by an Airmyn Park Primary School pupil. A Post Office at the Memorial Hall is open twice a week and staffed by volunteers. The parish church of St David's is a Grade II listed building originally built in 1318 and extended in 1676. The roof was replaced with a new one of Westmorland slate in 1858, as part of refurbishments that also included a bellcote and a porch on the west end. It also has a graveyard.

Port of Airmyn
Although the River Aire joins the Ouse at Airmyn, the main port facilities for the Aire and Calder Navigation were originally further upstream at Rawcliffe. However, in 1736 they decided to buy land at Airmyn, as the water was deeper, and larger vessels could not always reach Rawcliffe, particularly on neap tides. The land was bought in 1744, and Airmyn gradually replaced Rawcliffe, as staithes, woolsheds, a crane and various other buildings were erected by those who leased the navigation. In 1750, the Aire and Calder Company repaid those who had built the facilities, and took ownership of them. By 1774, most of the Aire and Calder staff were also based at Airmyn. It became possible to catch a ship from Airmyn to London, as a regular service began in 1758, charging the same fares as those from Hull to London.

Success was short-lived. In 1774, the Aire and Calder decided to build the Selby Canal, which would bypass the lower Aire and join the Ouse further upstream. Until then, Airmyn had acted as a transshipment point, where cargo was transferred from seagoing ships to river vessels. A new woolshed was built in 1775, and there was a coal yard, where coal was sold. Six staff were employed to manage the facility, which was also the base for the company's river boats. In one week in July 1775, 19 boats were loaded, and nine vessels, one from London and eight from Hull, had arrived within a four-day period. Once the Selby Canal opened in 1776, decline was rapid. The coalyard and the offices closed in 1779, and two years later, all buildings on the north bank of the river were demolished, while those on the south bank were sold. The boat repair yard closed soon afterwards.

Airmyn, along with nearby Rawcliffe, was the location of one of the first reliable reports of the practice of warping in agriculture in the 1730s. This was the temporary flooding of fields so as to fertilise the soil with the silt left behind.

Gallery

References

Bibliography

External links

Airmyn Park Primary School
A Guide to Airmyn and Historical Information
Airmyn's Historical Clock Tower Restoration website
Airmyn Parish Council website
Airmyn Village Hall/Community Association website

Villages in the East Riding of Yorkshire
Civil parishes in the East Riding of Yorkshire